On 16 January 1988, a Mormon fundamentalist group led by Addam Swapp and his mother-in-law, Vickie Singer, bombed a Church of Jesus Christ of Latter-day Saints chapel in Marion, Utah. The group retreated to their homestead a half mile away, holding up for 13 days as roughly 150 armed Bureau of Alcohol, Tobacco, and Firearms (ATF) and Federal Bureau of Investigation (FBI) agents surrounded their compound. The standoff ended after a shootout on January 28, which left dead a Utah Department of Corrections Lieutenant, Fred House. According to officials, the group had instigated the attack in hope of instigating the resurrection of their previous patriarch, John Singer, who had been killed in a smaller altercation with law enforcement nine years earlier.

The Singers and Addam Swapp

John Singer 
Singer was born in 1931 in the United States to German immigrants who emigrated back to their home country soon after his birth. Young Singer grew up during World War II, enlisting as a member of the Hitler Youth. After the war ended, Singer traveled back to the United States to live with his aunt in New York City. Soon his family followed. Once he earned enough money, Singer drove to Utah, where he established a television repair business out of his home and married his first wife, Vickie Lemon Singer. It is unclear when John Singer joined the Church of Jesus Christ of Latter-day Saints (LDS Church).

In March 1973, John and Vickie Singer removed their children from the local schools, claiming that they created an environment that permitted "vulgarity, sex, and drug use". The Singers also believed that textbooks should not be allowed to contain images of black and white children together. After a battle with the local school board, they were allowed to homeschool their children. Singer, however, continued to fight against the state-mandated supervision forced upon them. This led to a six-year legal battle, in which the Singers fought the Utah state government for custody of their children.  Eventually, John and Vickie Singer were charged with neglect and child abuse as they were found to not be adequately educating their children.

Several years earlier, the Singers had been excommunicated from the LDS Church as a result of their support of polygamy and other fundamentalist values that the church had outlawed at the beginning of the 20th century. During their time battling the state, Singer took on a second wife, Shirley Black, and her five children.

There were two raids on their home, the first taking place on 19 October 1978. In this instance, three Utah Highway Patrol officers dressed as reporters from the LA Times tackled him, before the family came to his aid and he was able to free a hand to pull out a gun. After this incident, the Singers were under nearly constant surveillance by law enforcement.  On 18 January 1979, Singer's compound was raided by a group of 10 Summit County Sheriff's officers. After pulling out his gun, Singer was shot to death.

After his death, Vickie Singer filed a lawsuit against the state for $110 million, but it was thrown out three years later. John Singer's death made him a martyr to both his family and certain libertarian and anti-federalist groups.

Addam Swapp 
Addam Swapp is the son-in-law of Utah polygamist, John Singer, having married two of his daughters. Swapp was born on 6 April 1961 in Salt Lake City, Utah to conservative Mormon parents. Before discovering John Singer, Swapp had already been acquainted with the idea of Mormon fundamentalism as his father had introduced him to a small group in Manti, Utah. When he was 17, Swapp heard on the news about Singer's fight against the government and decided to meet him. Before he had the chance, however, Singer was killed.

Later, Swapp married two of Singer's daughters: Heidi and Charlotte, with whom he had six children. The family continued to live on Singer's compound for the next nine years, growing a hatred for the LDS church. In 1987, Swapp sent a letter to several community members, demanding reconciliation for Singer's death and condemning the LDS church.

Singer-Swapp Standoff (1988)

Church Bombing 
At 3:00 a.m. on 16 January 1988, the nine-year anniversary of John Singer's death, Addam Swapp and Vickie Singer detonated 50 pounds of nitrate-boosted dynamite inside an LDS chapel in Marion, Utah. The bomb caused between $1,000,000 and $1.5 million in damage. After this, the family retreated to their home compound where they (nine adults and six children) prepared to defend themselves against the United States government. By that night, the compound had been surrounded by roughly 150 law enforcement personnel.

The day after the bombing, Vickie Singer's son-in-law, Roger Bates, was allowed by investigators to visit the compound, returning to explain that the family had no intention of surrendering. The group had bombed the church in hopes of resurrecting John Singer. Before the bombing, Swapp had placed a spear with nine feathers tied to it (supposedly signifying the nine years since Singer's death) into the ground near the church. Footprints left in the snow led straight from the spear back to the Singer estate, confirming investigators' suspicions. Addam Swapp claimed to have received a revelation from God that he must complete these actions in order to put into motion the events that would lead to the resurrection of his father-in-law.

Similar to the standoff at Ruby Ridge, the Singers were ready to defend themselves to the death if necessary, reportedly believing that the entire nation was on the verge of collapse. By the third day, family members were observed on the property collecting wood while officials waited, looking to find a way to bring the standoff to a peaceful conclusion.

On Monday, 25 January, officials sent in Ogden Kraut, a fellow fundamentalist and friend of the Singer family to serve as a mediator. The family again refused to cooperate, explaining only that the ordeal must escalate into a violent conflict in order for Swapp's earlier revelation to come to pass. By this time, the family had endured nine days under siege as officers had not only cut off their water and electricity, but also bombarded them with bright lights and loud noises during the night.

It was suspected that the family also had an extra reserve of explosives.

Shoot Out 
On Thursday, January 28, police made a final effort to take the compound, planning to use a flashing strobe light to incapacitate Singer before releasing police dogs on the compound. The light was meant to be triggered by a booby trapped loud speaker positioned near the house, but was instead triggered as Swapp shot it with his rifle. The dog handler, Utah Department of Corrections Lieutenant Fred House, was confused into thinking that the plan had worked, and stepped into the open to release the dogs. John Timothy Singer (John Singer's son), confined to a wheelchair at the time, opened fire on the officers, causing some superficial wounds on surrounding officers, and fatally wounding House. Despite the efforts of paramedics, House died on the scene. A firefight ensued in which Swapp was also injured.

Two armored personnel carriers then raided the compound, taking heavy fire. Swapp surrendered soon after, waving a white towel stained with blood.

Today

Incarceration 
Despite the fact that Addam Swapp was not the one to take the fatal shot, he was held responsible for the incident, receiving 17 years in federal prison for the bombing of the church, plus one to 15 years for the conviction of manslaughter. He was taken to a federal prison in Arizona, as several of his relatives worked in the Utah State Prison. Swapp reportedly stated shortly before his sentencing that he would not face any time in prison, as the government was on the verge of collapse. Upon entering prison, Swapp still appeared to be unmoved in his belief.

John Timothy Singer and Addam Swapp's son, Jonathan Swapp, were each sentenced to 10 years. John Timothy Singer served an additional eight years on a murder conviction. Vickie Singer was sentenced to five years in prison and five years parole for her role in the incident. After years of legal wrangling culminating in a violent standoff, on 28 January 1988, the Singer children were taken in to government custody.

Release 
In 2007, after Swapp's original conviction was served, he went under review, but was deemed by Ann House, the widow of Fred House to have not showed the proper amount of remorse and personal development. Six years later, On 9 July 2013, despite potentially serving a maximum of 75 years, Singer was released after only 25 years, as a result of a letter sent by Ann House, stating that he had spent enough time as well as showing personal growth and stability. During his final hearing, Swapp expressed his remorse and apologized profusely to the House family.

Vickie Singer was released on parole in 1994. John Timothy Singer was released on parole in early 2006.

Post-release 
In 2015, both Addam Swapp and his wife, Charlotte Singer sat down for interviews with the Sacred Groves Network, a group dedicated to sharing stories of people who left Mormonism to find something different. In his interview, he tells his life story, explaining the incident through his eyes and ending with the story about how he "found Jesus" through reading the Bible. In a similar video, John Timothy Singer also testifies of his newfound faith in the Bible.

The incident has since been reflected upon in several publications such as Sunstone Magazine and Year of Polygamy.

See also
 1992 Ruby Ridge Standoff
 Warren Jeffs

References 

Anti-Federalism
Armed standoffs in the United States
Law enforcement operations in the United States
Bureau of Alcohol, Tobacco, Firearms and Explosives
Deaths by firearm in Utah
Violence in Utah
1988 in Utah
Conflicts in 1988